State Route 301 (SR 301) is a south-north state highway located in the northwestern corner of the U.S. state of Georgia. Its route is entirely within Dade County.

Route description
SR 301 begins at the Alabama state line southwest of Trenton, where the roadway continues as Alabama State Route 75. The route heads northeast to an intersection with SR 136 west of Trenton. The highway continues heading northeast, before curving back to the northwest. It continues heading northwest, until it meets its northern terminus, a second encounter with the Alabama state line, where the roadway continues as Jackson County Road 90. The route's entire length is atop Sand Mountain.

History

Major intersections

See also

References

External links

301
Transportation in Dade County, Georgia